For the Love of Ray J is the soundtrack album from American R&B singer-songwriter Ray J's same-titled reality show. It was released on March 24, 2009, by Knockout Entertainment and E1 Music.  The track "Keep It Playa" also appears on Boss Hogg Outlawz's second album, Back by Blockular Demand: Serve & Collect II and "She's Freaky" also appears on Unk's second album, 2econd Season. The first official single, and music video "Sexy Ladies" was released in April 2009.

Critical reception 

AllMusic editor Jon O'Brien found that  "unsurprisingly, this official soundtrack to the series suggests the self-proclaimed Lothario still only has one thing on his mind, with an endless supply of seductive slow jams and drop-top anthems, packed with slicker than slick chat-up lines and suggestive come-ons that seem tailor-made for wooing the televised bevy of female admirers supposedly vying for his affections [...] For the Love of Ray J is nowhere near as cringe-worthy as his show of the same name, but despite its subject matter, it's an undeniably clichéd affair which lacks both passion and any genuine sense of emotion."

Track listing

Charts

References

Ray J albums
2009 soundtrack albums
Television soundtracks
E1 Music soundtracks
Knockout Entertainment soundtracks
Rhythm and blues soundtracks
Hip hop soundtracks
Albums produced by Detail (record producer)
Albums produced by Warren G